Helgard Lourens Müller (1 June 1963, Bloemfontein) is a South African former rugby union footballer. He was capped twice by the Springboks and played centre and wing for Free State.

Playing career
In 1981, Müller was chosen for the South African School Team. Müller appeared as a replacement for the Springboks against the New Zealand Cavaliers in 1986, and against the World Invitation Team in 1989. He also played three tour matches, and therefore appeared five times in the green-and-gold.  When the Free State played in the 1997 Super 12, Müller was captain. Müller's Springbok appearances were limited by the strong competition at centre at the time, including Danie Gerber, Michael du Plessis and Faffa Knoetze.

Müller appeared 142 times for the Free State in Currie Cup rugby, and 245 times in total, including at junior level, tour matches, the Vodacom Cup and Super Rugby.

Test history

Accolades
In 1984,  Müller was nominated as Young Player of the Year, together with Paul Botes, Niel Burger, Wessel Lightfoot and Uli Schmidt.

Trivia
Outside of rugby, Müller also represented Free State in cricket. He played six matches, with a batting average of 8.83 and a bowling average of 55.66

See also
List of South Africa national rugby union players – Springbok no. 551

External links 
 Helgard Müller at www.genslin.us/bokke

References 

1963 births
Living people
South African rugby union players
South Africa international rugby union players
Free State Cheetahs players
South African cricketers
Free State cricketers
Alumni of Grey College, Bloemfontein
Rugby union players from Bloemfontein
Rugby union centres
Rugby union wings